Sah (also Romanized as Şaḩ and Şah; also known as Sār) is a village in Tuyehdarvar Rural District, Amirabad District, Damghan County, Semnan Province, Iran. At the 2006 census, its population was 238, in 81 families.

References 

Populated places in Damghan County